This is a list of stratigraphic units, where pterosaur fossils have been recovered from. Units listed are all either formation rank or higher (e.g. group).

See also 
 Pterosaur
 List of fossil sites

References

Further reading

External links 
 The Pterosaur Database

 
Mesozoic paleontological sites
Pterosaurs